Talk About Jacqueline is a 1942 British comedy film directed by Harold French and Paul L. Stein and starring Hugh Williams, Carla Lehmann and Roland Culver. A woman tries to conceal her questionable past from her new husband. It was based on a 1926 novel by Katrin Holland which had previously been made into a 1937 German film Talking About Jacqueline.

Plot

Two sisters, Jacqueline and June, are very close and stand by each other, even though their stories separates them. The older sister, Jacqueline (Carla Lehmann), has a sexually liberal backstory, and the younger is quite unspoiled by life. The story picks up when Jacqueline travels to the French Riviera to change scenery, look for new adventures and search for an eligible bachelor who has no prior knowledge about her frivolous past. Soon she finds a suitable man, Doctor Michael Thomas (Hugh Williams), and they get married. Eventually Jacqueline is haunted by her past, as her picture turns up in a tabloid newspaper, and her husband catches a glimpse of his new bride's flamboyant previous mistakes. Jacqueline's younger sister, June (Joyce Howard), decides to help her older sister out to save her marriage from falling apart. She takes the blame and tells Michael that she is the one who has fooled around in the recent past. However, this information gives her problems of her own, as it finds its way to her own romantic interests, and threatens to destroy her own love life. The story ends with the older sister ultimately confessing her past to her husband and the other parties to the conflict, saving her sister with the truth.

Cast
 Hugh Williams as Doctor Michael Thomas
 Carla Lehmann as Jacqueline Marlow
 Roland Culver as Leslie Waddington
 Joyce Howard as June Marlow
 John Warwick as Donald Clark
 Mary Jerrold as Aunt Hellen
 Guy Middleton as Captain Tony Brook
 Max Adrian as Lionel
 Katie Johnson as Ethel
 Martita Hunt as Colonel's wife
 Anthony Holles as Attendant
 Roland Pertwee as Doctor in Hospital ( also co-wrote )

References

External links
 

1942 films
1940s English-language films
1942 comedy films
Films directed by Harold French
Films directed by Paul L. Stein
British comedy films
British black-and-white films
British remakes of German films
1940s British films